A Special Christmas is the fourth studio album and first Christmas album released by American female R&B trio SWV that was released in the United States on November 18, 1997, by RCA Records. The album follows the release of their third album Release Some Tension (1997) which was released four months earlier. It is a holiday album featuring cover versions. A Special Christmas would be the penultimate album the trio recorded together before they disbanded in 1998. Coko, the group's lead singer, released her first solo album in 1999.

Critical reception

Jose F. Promis, writing for Allmusic senior editor Stephen Thomas Erlewine write that "the endearing, sleek, soulful set finds the Sisters With Voices covering a sweet selection of holiday standards, and it differs from their previous albums because all three gals handle lead vocals [...] This album works because they treat the standards with respect and reverence, while still managing to put the SWV stamp on the recordings, and the sole new track is a highlight, instead of a bore, which many contemporary Christmas songs tend to be. A sweet, endearing, soulful set"

Track listing

Charts

References

SWV albums
1997 Christmas albums
Christmas albums by American artists
Contemporary R&B Christmas albums
RCA Records Christmas albums
Albums produced by Michael J. Powell